Albina Ligatcheva (born 18 October 1969 in Lipetsk, Russia) is a Russian rower. She competed in the women's coxless pair at the 2000 Summer Olympics. She also won a silver medal at the 1997 World Rowing Championships.

References

External links
 
 

Living people
1969 births
Russian female rowers
Olympic rowers of Russia
Rowers at the 1996 Summer Olympics
Rowers at the 2000 Summer Olympics
World Rowing Championships medalists for Russia
Sportspeople from Lipetsk